Elias 2-27 (2MASS J16264502-2423077) is a YSO star with a protoplanetary disk around it, located in the Ophiuchus Molecular Cloud (ρ Oph Cld, 5 Oph Cld, Ophiuchus Dark Cloud), a star-forming region in the Ophiuchus constellation, some  away. This star system became the first ever observed with density waves in the disk, giving it a spiral structure. Elias 2-27 is located near the double star Rho Ophiuchi (5 Ophiuchi).

Disk

In 2016, it was discovered that disk perturbations from density waves organized the disk debris into a pinwheel structure, with sweeping spiral arms; using observations from the Atacama Large Millimeter Array (ALMA) radio telescope. This marks the first instance of such an observation in a protoplanetary disk, though they have been previously predicted. The disk has a 14 AU wide gap at 69 AU radius with a reduced amount of dust. The disk is very massive at 0.08.

Further reading

References

Ophiuchus (constellation)
M-type stars
Pre-main-sequence stars
Circumstellar disks
J16264502-2423077